Two Russian submarines have been named Nerpa:

, a  launched in 1913 and saw action in the Black Sea during World War I
, an  launched in 2008, leased to the Indian Navy as Chakra from 2012 to 2021

Russian Navy ship names